The Best Of Manfred Mann's Earth Band Re-Mastered is a compilation album released in 1999 by Manfred Mann's Earth Band.  The title of track 4 on the compilation, "Blinded by the Light" is errantly printed as "Blinded by the Night".

Track listing 
"Living Without You" (Randy Newman) – 3:37
"Joybringer" (single version) (Gustav Holst, Manfred Mann, Mick Rogers, Chris Slade) – 3:24
"Be Not Too Hard" (single version) (Christopher Logue, Rogers) – 3:35
"Spirit in the Night" (Bruce Springsteen) – 6:27
"Blinded by the Light" (single version) (Springsteen) – 3:49
"Questions" (single version) (Mann, Slade) – 3:58
"Davy's On The Road Again" (single version) (John Simon, Robbie Robertson) – 3:38
"Mighty Quinn" (single version) (Bob Dylan) – 3:36
"California" (single version) (Mike Vickers) – 3:46
"You Angel You" (single version) (Dylan) – 3:47
"Don't Kill it Carol" (Mike Heron) – 6:17
"For You" (single version) (Springsteen) – 3:52
"Lies" (Denny Newman) – 4:37
"Demolition Man" (single version) (Gordon Sumner) – 3:46
"Runner" (single version) (Ian Thomas) – 4:39
"Somewhere In Africa"  (Trad arr Mann, John Lingwood) – 1:39
"Redemption Song" (live) (Bob Marley) – 3:15
"Going Underground" (single version) (Paul Weller) – 5:44
"Banquet" (Joni Mitchell) – 5:19

Re-mastered by: Robert M Corich and Mike Brown
Best of Compilation by Andy Taylor

Personnel 
Manfred Mann - keyboards, vocals
with various Manfred Mann's Earth Band members 1972-1998

References

Manfred Mann's Earth Band albums
1999 greatest hits albums